The R512 is a Regional Route in South Africa that connects Brits, North West with Randburg, Gauteng (north of Johannesburg) via the western side of Hartbeespoort. It is an alternative route to the R511 for travel between the Johannesburg Metropole and Brits.

Route

North West

Its northern origin is Brits, North West at an intersection with the R511 as Van Velden Street, becoming Rutgers Street, in a southerly direction. Just south of Brits, the R512 meets the R566 Road from Ga-Rankuwa.

The R512 continues southwards to meet the N4 Highway (Platinum Highway). Just after meeting the N4, the R512 reaches an interchange with the Pampoen Nek Pass (which is coming from the N4 West in the west) and it leaves the southerly road to become the Pampoen Nek Pass south-eastwards, passing under the R104 Route, to reach an interchange with the R560 Route west of Kosmos Village. From the R560 interchange, it continues south-east, crossing the Magalies River & turning eastwards at a T-junction by Arrows Rest, bypassing the Hartbeespoort Dam to the south, towards Broederstroom.

After Broederstroom, near Pelindaba, by the Crocodile River, as the road eastwards connects to Pretoria, the R512 turns southwards, as Pelindaba Road, towards Johannesburg. Just after, the R512 crosses into Gauteng.

Gauteng

From Broederstroom, the R512 makes a 25 km journey to Lanseria International Airport. The road then meets the R552 (6th Road) at Bultfontein and forms an interchange with the N14 Highway (Pretoria-Krugersdorp Highway).

After crossing the N14 highway and its old equivalent, the R114, it heads south towards Randburg, part of the Johannesburg Municipality, as Malibongwe Drive - formerly known as Hans Strijdom Drive. It passes through the lower-middle Cosmo City and Kya Sands townships before crossing the R564 Road (Witkoppen Road; Northumberland Avenue) and entering the more affluent Northriding and Olivedale suburbs. The R512 reaches an interchange with the N1 Highway (Johannesburg Western Bypass) (Johannesburg Ring Road) before continuing through Randburg as Malibongwe Drive, then West Street, to end in Linden, north of the Johannesburg Botanical Garden, at a junction with the M20.

History and developments
Before September 2020, the R512 from the R560 interchange to the N4 interchange took a different route.

At the R560 interchange, the R512 turned towards the north-east, bypassing Kosmos Village, to reach a 4-way junction in the suburb of Damdoryn (west of the Hartbeespoort Dam wall), where it turned to the west to be co-signed with the R104. After 5 kilometres, the R512 split from the R104 to become its own road northwards, proceeding to cross the N4 and enter Brits.

As of 03 September 2020, a new route has been opened named the Pampoen Nek Pass, effectively continuing the R512 northwards from the R560 interchange for 6 km up to the next off-ramp junction just south of the R512 & N4 interchange (north of the old R512 & R104 split), where the R512 now becomes the road northwards towards Brits while the Pampoen Nek Pass continues westwards to join the N4 West.

This new routing of the R512 effectively reduces the distance of the route from Broederstroom to Brits by 6 km.

Pampoen Nek Pass 

As of 2018, the South African National Roads Agency (SANRAL) was constructing a shortcut for the R512 Route, from its intersection with the R560 Route (north-west of Broederstroom) northwards up to just north of where the R512 and the R104 Route split (west of The Elephant Sanctuary of Hartbeespoort), where there is a ramp onto the N4 Platinum Highway West, in a highway format.

The R512's junction with the R560 west of Hartbeespoort Dam is an off-ramp junction and the next and last junction just north of the R104 and R512 junction west of the Elephant Sanctuary is also an off-ramp interchange before the freeway goes westwards to join the N4 West.

It was built to reduce the traffic that occurs on the older longer section of the R512 through Damdoryn, which is also labelled as a high accident zone adjacent to Kosmos Village. It is meant to be a shortcut and to reduce the distance for travelers using the R512 to either join the N4 Highway West to Rustenburg & Sun City or to go to Brits. To some extent, this new route also reduces the traffic on the R511 Route, which passes on the other side of the Hartbeespoort Dam (through Hartbeespoort Central) on its way to Brits, and long distance movements will no longer have to interfere with local traffic. This new road is to be used by motorists who want to travel from the Johannesburg Municipality (Sandton & Randburg) (and nearby areas, like Pretoria West) to cities like Brits, Sun City and Rustenburg.

On 3 September 2020, the Minister of Transport, Fikile Mbalula, together with the South African National Roads Agency and the Madibeng Local Municipality, officially opened the new road. This route, known as the Pampoen Nek Highway, is 6 kilometres in length from the R560 interchange to the interchange where the R512 turns north towards Brits (6 kilometres shorter than the old Z-shaped route passing by Kosmos Village, Damdoryn and the Elephant Sanctuary).

References

Regional Routes in Gauteng
Regional Routes in North West (South African province)
Highways in South Africa